Ole Kolterud (1 May 1903, Nordre Land – 6 December 1974) was a Norwegian skier.

He competed at the 1928 Winter Olympics in St. Moritz, where he placed 8th in the Nordic combined.

He was a brother of Sverre Kolterud. He represented the club Nordre Land IL.

References

External links

1903 births
1974 deaths
People from Nordre Land
Norwegian male Nordic combined skiers
Olympic Nordic combined skiers of Norway
Nordic combined skiers at the 1928 Winter Olympics
Sportspeople from Innlandet
20th-century Norwegian people